Igreja de Santa Maria de Airães is a church in Portugal. The current building was constructed during the late 13th or early 14th century AD, though the site has held a church since at least the 11th century AD. It has been classified as a National Monument since 1977.

References

Churches in Porto District
National monuments in Porto District